Tamme is a village in Elva Parish, Tartu County in Estonia. It is located on the eastern shore of Lake Võrtsjärv.

References

Villages in Tartu County